Low Pass may refer to

 Low Pass, Oregon
 Low-pass filter
 Low Pass in Mountain passes in Montana
 Low Pass Lake, in Elmore County, Idaho, United States
 A flypast very close to the ground